John Gillespie Magee (October 10, 1884 – September 11, 1953) was an American Episcopal priest, best known for his work in Nanjing as a missionary, and for the films and pictures he shot during the Nanjing Massacre. He is also credited with saving thousands of lives throughout the event.

Early life and education
Magee was born in 1884 in Pittsburgh, Pennsylvania.  Magee came from a wealthy Pittsburgh family. His brother was aviator and Congressman James McDevitt Magee.  Magee went to school at Yale University, where he was a member of Skull and Bones, and then on to divinity school in Massachusetts.  A missionary in China, he was the minister at an Episcopal mission in Nanjing from 1912 to 1940.

While in China, Magee married a missionary from Helmingham in Suffolk, England, Faith Emmeline Backhouse. They had four sons: John, Hugh, David and Christopher. Their oldest son went on to write the famous poem High Flight, when he served in the Royal Canadian Air Force during the Second World War.

Nanjing Massacre
During the Nanjing Massacre, Magee was performing missionary work in Nanjing (Nanking) and was at the same time the chairman of Nanking Committee of the International Red Cross Organization. During the period when hundreds of thousands of defenseless Chinese were slaughtered by the Japanese army, Magee was appalled by the atrocity of the Japanese invaders.

Disregarding his own safety, Magee ran out of the Nanking Safety Zone, going through streets and lanes, and took part in rescuing more than 200,000 Chinese soldiers and civilians who were facing being slaughtered. Magee filmed several hundred minutes with what was then the most advanced 16mm movie camera, which filmed at 6 frames per second.

Some people wanted to buy Magee's original film for large sums of money for political purposes, yet he would not budge. He said he wanted to give the historical materials to the right person without charge at the right moment.

The film
Magee managed to film abuses of Chinese civilians by Japanese soldiers during the Nanjing Massacre in December 1937. Magee's films were smuggled out of Nanjing; copies were shown to members of the United States government, and sent to the German Foreign Ministry in Berlin, in an unsuccessful attempt to persuade them to institute sanctions against the Japanese government.

On 10 February 1938, the Legation Secretary of the German Embassy, Rosen, wrote to his Foreign Ministry about a film made in December by Magee to recommend its purchase. Here is an excerpt from his letter and a description of some of its shots, kept in the Political Archives of the Foreign Ministry in Berlin.

 «During the Japanese reign of terror in Nanking – which, by the way, continues to this day to a considerable degree – the Reverend John Magee, a member of the American Episcopal Church Mission who has been here for almost a quarter of a century, took motion pictures that eloquently bear witness to the atrocities committed by the Japanese. (....) One will have to wait and see whether the highest officers in the Japanese army succeed, as they have indicated, in stopping the activities of their troops, which continue even today (...)» 

Magee's role in documenting the Nanjing Massacre is featured in the movie Don't Cry, Nanking. In the film Nanking, Magee was portrayed by actor Hugo Armstrong.

In 2001, John Magee's son, David Magee, donated the four rolls of film tape (105 minutes in length) that his father documented with a 16mm camera to Nanjing Massacre Memorial Hall.

Disposition of the Nanjing Massacre film
In 1953 Magee left the 16mm camera and the film to his son David, who had accompanied him in Nanjing. In 2002, when David heard of the news that China was going to build a museum in memory of the people who were killed during the Nanjing Massacre, he came to Nanjing.

According to his father's last wish, he offered the historical materials without charge. To remember the special contribution that Magee had made to the Nanjing people, a library was built in John Magee’s name.

Later career
After Magee left Nanjing, he served as curate at Church of the Presidents St. John's Episcopal Church, Lafayette Square in Washington, D.C.  While there, he was one of the Episcopal priests who officiated at the funeral of President Franklin D. Roosevelt in April 1945. Magee also served as chaplain to President Harry S. Truman.

Before his death on September 11, 1953, he also served as the Episcopal chaplain at Yale University.

See also
Minnie Vautrin
John Rabe
Robert O. Wilson
List of Protestant missionaries in China
Christianity in China

References

External links
 About Magee's Documentary
 Yale's Nanking Massacre Project – A huge amount of information on Magee as well as the Nanjing events of World War II.

1884 births
1953 deaths
19th-century American Episcopalians
American Anglican missionaries
American Episcopal priests
American expatriates in China
Anglican missionaries in China
People assisting Chinese during the Nanjing Massacre
Witnesses of the Nanjing Massacre
Yale University alumni